Six Degrees of Inner Turbulence is the sixth full-length studio album by progressive metal band Dream Theater, released as a double-disc album on January 29, 2002, through Elektra Records. Excluding the A Change of Seasons EP, it is the first Dream Theater album to feature a title track. It is also their second longest studio album to date, after The Astonishing (2016). All songs from it have been played live.

Songs
The first track of the album, "The Glass Prison", is the beginning of the Twelve-step Suite, dealing with Mike Portnoy's story of rehabilitation from alcoholism, continued in tracks on subsequent albums ("This Dying Soul" on Train of Thought, "The Root of All Evil" on Octavarium, "Repentance" on Systematic Chaos and "The Shattered Fortress" on Black Clouds & Silver Linings). "The Glass Prison" is composed of three parts, mirroring the first three of the twelve steps of the AA program by Bill W. for rehabilitation of alcoholics. Furthermore, it begins with the static phonograph noise that ended "Finally Free" on Metropolis Pt. 2: Scenes from a Memory (1999).
"Blind Faith" features lyrics written by James LaBrie about questioning religious belief. It is the second longest song for which LaBrie has contributed lyrics to date, the longest being "Sacrificed Sons" from Octavarium. It was also the first time he had written lyrics for more than one song on an album. The next time would also be on Octavarium.
In the song "Misunderstood", John Petrucci wrote and played the guitar solo, and then reversed it. He then learned how to play this reversed version, and he tries to mimic the reversed version live with effects. This track is in its shorter radio edit form on the cassette edition.
"The Great Debate" is intended to be a non-partisan song dealing with the topic of stem-cell research. It was originally titled "Conflict at Ground Zero" based on the lyrics in the chorus but was changed at the last minute as news reports started to refer to the site of the 9/11 terrorist attack in New York City as "Ground Zero". The band was actually in a Manhattan studio conducting final mixes of the album on the day in question.
Lyrics for the song "Disappear" were written by James LaBrie about the subject of death; it was originally titled "Move On". This track is omitted entirely from the cassette edition.
The sixth song, "Six Degrees of Inner Turbulence", which makes up the entire second CD (albeit split into eight separate tracks), is the longest song Dream Theater have recorded to date. While recording, they wanted to keep the song at 20 minutes, but more and more ideas came which resulted in the length doubling. Realizing that they would have to cut "Disappear" and "Misunderstood" to keep the album at one CD, their record label was now open for the idea of a double album, something the band had previously been denied when recording Falling into Infinity for former label EastWest. Despite this, the cassette edition reduced "Misunderstood" to its radio edit version and omitted "Disappear" entirely.
The last chord of "Six Degrees of Inner Turbulence" is used to open "As I Am" on the next album Train of Thought, continuing a chain which ended with Octavarium.

Influences
Influences for the album's writing and recording, according to the authors, include Metallica's Master of Puppets, Radiohead's OK Computer (and also a Radiohead bootleg Portnoy brought in), Pantera's Far Beyond Driven and the song "Mouth for War", Megadeth's Rust in Peace, U2's Achtung Baby, Tool's Ænima, Nine Inch Nails' The Downward Spiral, Soundgarden's Superunknown, Alice in Chains' Dirt, Kevin Gilbert's Thud, King's X's Faith Hope Love and Galactic Cowboys' Space in Your Face, Béla Bartók, Rage Against the Machine's The Battle of Los Angeles, and Maria Tipo's Chopin Nocturnes.

Track listing

Disc one

Disc two

Personnel

Dream Theater
James LaBrie – lead vocals
John Petrucci – guitars, vocals, production
Jordan Rudess – keyboards
John Myung – bass guitar
Mike Portnoy – drums, percussion, vocals, production

Additional personnel
Howard Portnoy – gong drum on "The Great Debate" outro

Production
Doug Oberkircher − engineer
J.P. Sheganowski – assistant engineer
Kevin Shirley – mixing
Claudius Mittendorfer – assistant mixing
George Marino – mastering
Eugene "UE" Natasi – assistant mastering
Dung Hoang – illustration
Ken Schles – photography
May Redding – stylist (photography)
JMatic – art direction

Charts

References

External links

Dream Theater albums
2002 albums
Elektra Records albums
Concept albums